Come Midnight Monday is a 1982 Australian children's TV series. It consisted of seven 30 minute episodes first broadcast in 1982.

Plot summary
Four teenagers fight plans to close the Winnawadgery railway, scrap its veteran steam engine Wombat and build a highway in its place. Their campaign runs into opposition from a prominent local businessman. They enlist the help of retired engine driver Angus McPhee.

Production
The script was written by regular Bellbird writer Roger Dann, adapted from the children's novel by David Burke OAM. It was filmed mainly on location at Cockatoo in Victoria. The train sequences were filmed on the Puffing Billy Railway with NA class locomotive 12A portraying the Wombat.

Cast
 Stephen Comey as Tim Forsyth
 Tim Blake as Squeak Hoolihan
 Sally Boyden as Beverley "Biff" Hoolihan
 Jacqui Gordon as Jenny "Bugsy" Hoolihan
 Tommy Dysart as Angus McPhee
 Peter Cummins as Albert Spack

Crew
 Producer: David Zweck
 Director: Mark Callan
 Scriptwriter: Roger Dunn
 Sound recordist: John Beanland
 Production Designer: Paul Cleveland, Alwyn Harbott
 Music: Kevin Hocking

References

External links
Come Midnight Monday at IMDb

Australian Broadcasting Corporation original programming
Australian children's television series
1982 Australian television series debuts
1982 Australian television series endings